Blaze Riorden (born February 13, 1994) is an American professional lacrosse player who plays as a goalie for Chaos Lacrosse Club of the Premier Lacrosse League and as a forward for the Philadelphia Wings of the National Lacrosse League. In the PLL he has won three straight Oren Lyons Goalie of the Year awards, making him the first goalie to do so. He is also one of only two field lacrosse goalies to win league MVP at the professional level and is widely regarded as one of the greatest lacrosse goalies of all time.

Early life and career 
Riorden was raised in Fairport, New York, the son of Mike and Jeannie Riorden. He has one brother, Connor. Riorden's family had season tickets to see the Rochester Knighthawks, and he began playing lacrosse at the age of four as an attackman, however he switched to goalie part time as a child when he injured his team's goalie with a shot, and would play both positions throughout high school. While at Fairport High School, he would earn three varsity letters each in lacrosse and football, and won two Section V state championships and committed to play lacrosse at University at Albany where he would have the opportunity to play in goal and on man-up offense.

Collegiate career 
Riorden started 18 games in goal as a freshman at Albany, where he posted the second-most wins in program history with 13. He would be named to the America East All-Rookie Team as well as second-team all-league.

As a sophomore, Riorden finished third in the nation in saves per game and twelfth in save percentage, leading the America East in both categories, and being named first-team all-conference at the end of the season. He would backstop Albany to their first NCAA Tournament win in seven years by making 13 saves and allowing just six goals in the first round against Loyola. He would also get some opportunities to play attack on man up, scoring his first career goal against Bryant.

In his junior season, Riorden would lead the America East in save percentage, saves per game, and goals against average, once again making first-team all-league. He would make 214 saves on the season, good for eighth in Albany history, and contributed to the program's first-ever shutout in a game against UMass Lowell. He also made national headlines for his coast-to-coast goal against Cornell in the NCAA Tournament, being nominated for the ESPY Award for Best Play.

In his senior season, Riorden would set Albany's career record for saves and was named a finalist for the Tewaaraton Award, as well as a third-team All-American, first-team all-conference, and America East Defensive Player of the Year.

Box career 
Following his freshman season at Albany, Riorden was invited by teammate Ty Thompson to spend the summer on the Akwesasne Reservation, where he played box lacrosse for the first time as a forward. He played Junior B lacrosse for the Akwesasne Indians, and then returned every summer during his collegiate career.  After his college career, he traveled to Brampton, Ontario to play Senior A Box before eventually winning a spot with the Buffalo Bandits in 2017, playing nine games before being released. He then joined the Philadelphia Wings for their inaugural season in 2018.

Riorden has also represented the United States in the 2015 (where he was the only college player) and 2019 editions of the World Indoor Lacrosse Championship, winning bronze medals both times.

NLL Statistics

Professional field career

MLL 
Riorden was drafted 51st overall by the Rochester Rattlers in the 2016 MLL Draft. He would primarily serve as a backup to John Galloway in his first two seasons, though he saw more action in his third season following the team's move to Dallas, in part due to Galloway's participation in the 2018 World Lacrosse Championship. He made his first career start in a 15-9 win over the Chesapeake Bayhawks in which he made 16 saves.

PLL 
Riorden was part of the original group of players to join Paul Rabil's PLL, being assigned to Chaos Lacrosse Club. During his first season, he was named as an All-Star and won the inaugural Oren Lyons Goalie of the Year Award. He would once again win the award the following season while helping Chaos to the Championship Game. In 2021, he was named as a captain for the All-Star Game, though he was ultimately unable to participate due to injury. He was also a finalist for the Jim Brown MVP Award.

Playing style 
Riorden has been called a "once in a generation talent" by the PLL. He is known for using a Butterfly style, similar to a hockey goaltender, being one of the first field lacrosse goalies to do so. He is also known for his stick skills due to his background as an attackman and due to this, he is able to create transition opportunities for his teammates.

Sources 

Living people
1994 births
American lacrosse players
Lacrosse goaltenders
Albany Great Danes men's lacrosse players
Buffalo Bandits players
Philadelphia Wings players
Rochester Rattlers players
Premier Lacrosse League players
People from Fairport, New York
Lacrosse forwards
Sportspeople from Rochester, New York